Dinara Wagner ( born 25 May 1999) is a Kalmyk-born German chess player. Until 2022, she played for the Chess Federation of Russia. Since 2020, she holds the title Woman Grandmaster.

Biography
Wagner is from Elista, the capital of the Republic of Kalmykia. During her childhood, she won the Russian Junior Chess Championships for girls five times. Since 2014, she holds the title Woman International Master and in 2016 she came in third at the World Girls Junior Championship. She was the best female player at the 2019 European Rapid Chess Championships, and the following year she achieved the title Woman Grandmaster.

At the Higher School of Economics in Moscow, Wagner studied the world economy, graduating in 2020 with a bachelor's degree. She then moved to Heidelberg and started a master's degree in economics at the Ruprecht-Karls University. In 2022, she married fellow chess player Dennis Wagner.

After the beginning of Russian invasion of Ukraine in 2022, Wagner left the Chess Federation of Russia, temporarily played under the FIDE flag, and joined the German Chess Federation in May 2022. In the same year she won the women's  tournament.

FIDE ratings

Notes

References

External links

 
 
 

1999 births
Living people
Chess woman grandmasters
German female chess players
People from Elista
Sportspeople from Kalmykia